The Suntory Open was a professional golf tournament on the Japan Golf Tour. It was founded in 1973 by Suntory, when it was held at the Ashitaka 600 club. The following year it was held at Narashino Country Club. It remained at Narashino until 1998, when it moved to Sobu Country Club.

The prize fund for the final tournament in 2007 was ¥100,000,000 with ¥20,000,000 going to the winner.

Tournament hosts

Winners

Notes

References

External links
Coverage on Japan Golf Tour's official site
Official site 

Defunct golf tournaments in Japan
Former Japan Golf Tour events
Sport in Chiba Prefecture
Suntory
Recurring sporting events established in 1973
Recurring sporting events disestablished in 2007